Woodsboro Independent School District is a public school district based in Woodsboro, Texas (USA).  In addition to Woodsboro, the district also serves the town of Bayside

Schools
Woodsboro ISD has two campuses - 
Woodsboro Junior/Senior High (Grades 7-12)
Woodsboro Elementary School (Grades PK-6).

In 2009, the school district was rated "academically acceptable" by the Texas Education Agency.

References

External links
 

School districts in Refugio County, Texas